The Kru, Kroo, Krou or Kuru are a West African ethnic group who are indigenous to western Ivory Coast and eastern Liberia. They migrated and settled along various points of the West African coast, notably Freetown, Sierra Leone, but also the Ivorian and Nigerian coasts.  The Kru people are a large ethnic group that is made up of several sub-ethnic groups in Liberia and Ivory Coast. These tribes include Bété, Bassa, Krumen, Guéré, Grebo, Klao, Dida, Krahn people and, Jabo people. The kru people were more valuable as traders and sailors on slave ships than as slave labor. To ensure their status as “freemen,” they initiated the practice of tattooing their foreheads and the bridge of their nose with indigo dye to distinguish them from slave labor.

Part of the Grebo people were called Krumen and hired as free sailors on European ships, initially engaged in the slave trade, and then when that ended in the coastal trade in goods. The Krumen were famous for their skills in navigating and sailing the Atlantic and the homophony with crewmen was noted. Their maritime expertise evolved along the west coast of Africa where they made a living as fishermen and traders. Knowing the in-shore waters of the western coast of Africa, and having nautical experience, they were employed as sailors, navigators and interpreters aboard slave ships, as well as American and British warships used against the slave trade.

The Kru history is one marked by a strong sense of ethnicity and resistance to occupation. In 1856 when part of Liberia was still known as the independent Republic of Maryland, the Kru along with the Grebo resisted Maryland settlers' efforts to control their trade. They were also infamous amongst early European slave raiders as being especially averse to capture.

The Kru are one of the many ethnic groups in Liberia, comprising 7% of the population. Theirs is also one of the main languages spoken. The Kru are one of the three main indigenous group players in Liberia's socio-political activities along with the Krahn and Mano people.

Notable ethnic Krus include the 25th President of Liberia George Weah, who is of mixed Kru, Gbee, Mano, and Bassa heritage, as well as his predecessor, former President Ellen Johnson Sirleaf, who is of mixed Kru, Gola, and German ancestry. Dr. George Toe Washington, Former Armed Forces Chief of Staff of Liberia and Ambassador to the US, Canada and Mexico who is of Kru and Grebo ancestry. Soccer star William Jebor is exclusively of Kru background, as is Christian Evangelist Samuel Morris who was originally known as Kaboo. Mary Broh, the former mayor of Monrovia, is of mixed Kru and Bassa ancestry. Didwho Twe, a judge and politician, who ran for President of Liberia in 1951 was of Kru heritage.

See also 
Kru languages
Seedies and Kroomen
https://nyanfore-nimley.org/

References

Further reading

Baldwin, Lindley, Samuel Morris: Men of Faith Series, Bethany House Publishers, 1942;
Behrens, Christine Les Kroumen de la Côte Occidentale d'Afrique, Bordeaux: Centre d'Etudes de Géographie Tropicale, 1974;
Brooks, George, The Kru Mariner in the Nineteenth Century: A Historical Compendium, Newark,Del., 1972 (Liberian Studies Monograph Series no.1);
Davis, Ronald, Ethnohistorical Studies on the Kru Coast, Newark, Del., 1976 (Liberian Studies Monograph Series no.5);
Fraenkel, Merran, Tribe and Class in Monrovia, New York-London: OUP, 1964;
Mekeel, Scudder, "Social Administration of the Kru: A Preliminary Survey", Africa 10 (1937) 75–96; 11 (460-68);
Massing, Andreas W., The Economic Anthropology of the Kru, Wiesbaden: Steiner, 1980 (Studien zur Kulturkunde 55);
Massing, Andreas W., Kru, in The Oxford Encyclopedia of Maritime History, vol.2, 306–309, New York, 2007;
Schwartz, Alfred,  Peuplement Autochthone et Immigration dans le Sud-Ouest Ivoirien, Abidjan: ORSTOM, 1973;
Tauxier, Louis, Les Kroomen de la Forêt de Côte d'Ivoire, Paris: Larose, 1935;
Zetterström, Kjell, Ethnographic Survey of Southeastern Liberia: Preliminary Report on the Kru, Robertsport: Centre of African Culture, 1969

 
Ethnic groups in Liberia
Female genital mutilation
Female genital mutilation by country